"Exclusivity" is a number-one R&B single by the duo Damian Dame. Taken from their eponymous album, the song spent two weeks at number-one on the US R&B chart and peaked at number forty-two on the Billboard Hot 100. The single also made it to number forty-five on dance charts.

Personnel
Damian Dame: Lead & Background Vocals, Rap
Deah Dame: Lead & Background Vocals
L.A. Reid: Drum Programming, Percussion, Vocal Arrangement, Rhythm Arrangement
Babyface: Keyboards, Vocal Arrangement, Rhythm Arrangement
Kayo: Bass, Rhythm Arrangement
Donald Parks: Drum & MIDI Programming, Synthesizer (Fairlight CMI III)

Peak positions

See also
List of number-one R&B singles of 1991 (U.S.)

References

1991 singles
Damian Dame songs
1990 songs
New jack swing songs
American hip hop songs
Songs written by L.A. Reid
Songs written by Babyface (musician)
Song recordings produced by L.A. Reid
Song recordings produced by Babyface (musician)
LaFace Records singles